The 2015 Campeonato Carioca de Futebol Série B was the 38th edition of the main division of football in Rio de Janeiro. The contest is organized by Federação de Futebol do Estado do Rio de Janeiro (FERJ). The competition consisted of two stages: Taça Santos Dumont and Taça Corcovado. In the first, the times of a group face each other in turn single. In the second, they face within the key. The champions of each shift, plus the best raters in general, which have not yet been champions, are in the Triangular Final to decide the champion.

In this edition, there will be access to three times for the Serie A in 2016. Being the champion entering the main phase and the other participating  in a selective, that will be disputed even by the end of this year. The measure was approved in the Council of Arbitration on 30 January. The formula of dispute this Selective will be determined in subsequent meetings.

Participating teams

Taça Santos Dumont

Group A

Group B

Knockout stage

Taça Corcovado

Group A

Group B

Knockout stage

Turn End

Overall standings

References

Campeonato Carioca seasons